Erin Lee Carr (born April 15, 1988) is an American documentary filmmaker. She is also an author for publications including VICE and her memoir called All That You Leave Behind: A Memoir, a story about love, addiction, and the relationship between father and daughter. In 2015, Variety included Carr as one of its "10 Documakers To Watch". Carr made the 2018 Forbes 30 under 30 list.

Her documentaries include Thought Crimes: The Case of the Cannibal Cop, Mommy Dead and Dearest and the HBO documentaries I Love You, Now Die: The Commonwealth vs. Michelle Carter and At the Heart of Gold: Inside the USA Gymnastics Scandal. Carr also directed and produced the high-profile Netflix documentary Britney vs Spears, chronicling Britney Spears's attempts to challenge her abusive 13-year conservatorship by her father Jamie Spears; the film made a number of accusations against Spears's business manager Lou Taylor.

Carr is the daughter of the late The New York Times media columnist David Carr.

Early life and education 
Carr was born in Minneapolis, Minnesota to journalist David Carr and Anna Lee.

Carr and her twin sister, Meagan Carr, were born two and a half months early. David Carr and Anna O'Leary lost custody of the twins because of their drug addiction. Carr and her sister went into foster care for a summer. When her father got out of rehab, he regained physical custody of the girls and in 1994 married Jill Rooney, who became Erin's step-mother.

In addition to her twin sister Meagan, a mental health worker, Carr has a half-sister named Maddie. The family lived in Minneapolis, Minnesota, and then New Jersey.

In 2010, Carr graduated from the University of Wisconsin–Madison with a Bachelor of Arts in Communication Arts. In the Spring of 2010, Carr attended FAMU in Prague in the Czech Republic.

Career 
In the Summer of 2009, Carr was an intern at Fox Searchlight Pictures, working in the public relations department. In the Fall of 2009, Carr worked as a Media Assistant at the Instructional Media Center in the Communication Arts Department at the University of Wisconsin–Madison. In November 2010, she worked as an office production assistant on Lena Dunham's TV show, Girls.

VICE 
Carr worked as a college intern at VICE. After graduation, in 2010 she got a full-time job at VICE where she worked up to an Associate Producer position for Vice Media's Motherboard, an online magazine and video channel that focused on the intersection of technology, science and people. She was at VICE for three years.

In 2011, Carr shot video and documented the wi-fi towers that Occupy Wall Street protestors had set up in Zuccotti Park in New York City, and how the NYPD dealt with the towers and protestors in a story called Who Smashed the Laptops from Occupy Wall Street? Inside the NYPD's Lost and Found.

In 2012, Carr developed Spaced Out for Motherboard. Spaced Out had twelve videos, nine of which Carr helped create. She helped produce UFO sightings in Colorado, Using the Sun to Make Music, The Man Who Hunts Spy Satellites, Save the Last Great Telescope, and The First Animal to Survive in Space. Carr was an assistant producer for Building a Homemade Space Craft, Blowing up Asteroids with NASA and Neil deGrasse Tyson, New York's Strangest Astronaut, and Homemade Mission to Mars by Tom Sachs.

In 2013, Carr developed My Life Online for VICE Motherboard. Carr produced three videos for this series: Shoenice22 Will Eat Anything for Fame, The Story of Karl Welzein, According to @dadboner Creator Mike Burns, and Jerome LOL on Remixing the Internet and the Ageless Beauty of Web 1.0.

In 2013, Carr produced a documentary for VICE called Click. Print. Gun. about Cody Wilson, the owner of Defense Distributed. The film shows how 3D-printing is creating new issues with gun production. Wilson is against gun control and is working to create a full blueprint for a completely 3D printed gun with hopes to put it online for anyone to have access. The documentary won a 2014 Webby Award.

Vox Media 
In June 2013, she left VICE for Vox Media's The Verge. She worked as a producer, a position she held for four months. While at Vox, Carr curated and produced long and short stories for The Verge.

HBO 
In November 2013, Carr became a freelance director for HBO Documentary Films.

In April 2015, Carr's first documentary for HBO, Thought Crimes: The Case of the Cannibal Cop premiered at the 2015 Tribeca Film Festival. Released by HBO in May 2015, Thought Crimes is a documentary film about Gilberto Valle, an ex-New York City Police Officer who was arrested on two counts; one for kidnapping conspiracy and illegally gaining access to a law-enforcement database. Thought Crimes received positive reviews and was a finalist for the 2016 Cinema Eye Honors in the non-fiction film for television category.

In May 2017, HBO released Carr's documentary film Mommy Dead and Dearest, which was about the murder of Dee Dee Blanchard, allegedly by her daughter Gypsy Rose Blanchard. It was an official selection for SXSW, Hot Docs and DocAviv and was one of the most-watched documentaries on HBO in 2017.

In 2019, Carr's two-part HBO documentary I Love You, Now Die: The Commonwealth Vs. Michelle Carter premiered at SXSW. The film chronicles the Michelle Carter criminal case. It was also an official selection at Hot Docs and the Montclair Film Festival. It was released on HBO in the Summer of 2019.

In 2019, Carr's film At the Heart of Gold: Inside the USA Gymnastics Scandal, premiered at the 2019 Tribeca Film Festival, and then aired on HBO. The film follows the USA Gymnastics sex abuse scandal, with a focus on the survivor's takes surrounding the predatory attitudes of former USA Gymnastics doctor Larry Nassar.

Netflix
In 2018, Carr directed an episode of the Netflix documentary series Dirty Money called released "Drug Short" which examines how big pharmaceutical companies exploit patients seeking life saving drugs.

Carr directed the limited series, How to Fix a Drug Scandal, that was released on Netflix on April 1, 2020. How to Fix a Drug Scandal is a four-part documentary series that depicts the arrest and prosecution of Sonja Farak and Annie Dookhan, two former state drug lab technicians. Dookhan was accused of forging reports and tampering with samples to produce desired results. How to Fix a Drug Scandal depicts the role of former Attorney General of Massachusetts Martha Coakley, who was accused of political cover up and of minimizing the length of time Farak was battling drug addictions to cocaine, meth, and other substances: from almost 10 years to only one and a half years.

After the February 2021 release and public reaction to Framing Britney Spears, a New York Times presentation on FX, Bloomberg announced that Carr was working on an additional documentary to be streamed on Netflix about the Spears, namely her father Jamie Spears' and her former business manager Lou M. Taylor's control of the star's finances and career under a 13-year conservatorship.

Personal life 
Carr lives in New York City. Carr has discussed her struggles with alcohol and becoming sober.

Bibliography 
In April 2019, Carr published a memoir called All That You Leave Behind: A Memoir for Random House. All That You Leave Behind started out as a self-published Medium article called Still Rendering that Carr wrote a year after her father's death. The book describes Carr's growth in her career as a documentary filmmaker and is a celebration of her father, David Carr, that includes emails and GChat and other records that documented her relationship with him.

Filmography

References

External links 

 
 
 Erin Lee Carr at Motherboard

1988 births
Living people
American documentary film directors
American film producers
Film directors from Minnesota
Film directors from New York City
People from Minneapolis
American twins
University of Wisconsin–Madison School of Journalism & Mass Communication alumni
American women documentary filmmakers
21st-century American women